The World Group was the highest level of Davis Cup competition in 2013. The first-round losers go into the Davis Cup World Group Play-offs, and the winners progress to the quarterfinals. The quarterfinalists were guaranteed a World Group spot for 2014. Czech Republic defended their Davis Cup title, by defeating the Serbian team in Belgrade in the final.

Participating teams

Seeds

Draw

First round

Canada vs. Spain

Italy vs. Croatia

Belgium vs. Serbia

United States vs. Brazil

France vs. Israel

Argentina vs. Germany

Kazakhstan vs. Austria

Switzerland vs. Czech Republic

The doubles match was the second longest match of all time (7 hours and 1 minute).

Quarterfinals

Canada vs. Italy

United States vs. Serbia

Argentina vs. France

Kazakhstan vs. Czech Republic

Semifinals

Serbia vs. Canada

Czech Republic vs. Argentina

Final

Serbia vs. Czech Republic

References

World Group